, better known by his stage name , is a Japanese actor, voice actor, singer, and rakugoka affiliated with Gokū and 21st Century Fox. After making his voice acting debut in 1989 as the male version of Ranma Saotome in Ranma ½, Yamaguchi went on to other notable roles, including Inuyasha in Inuyasha and L  in Death Note. He currently voices Shinichi Kudo and Kaito Kid in Detective Conan and Usopp in One Piece. He is married and has a son, Ryunosuke, and a daughter, Akane. Ryunosuke and Akane are also voice actors, while the latter is also a rakugoka.

Other ventures
In Japanese dubs of international works, Yamaguchi is the voice of Kyle Broflovski, Bugs Bunny, and Crash Bandicoot. After performing rakugo at an event in 2017, Yamaguchi started studying under Shirano Tatekawa. He uses the name  as a rakugoka.

Yamaguchi made his first public appearance in North America at Otakon 2008 and in Sakura-Con 2009. His third appearance to date has been at Animazement in 2010. He also made a fourth appearance in Hawaii at Kawaii Kon in 2011.

Filmography

Television animation
Ranma ½ (1989–92), Ranma Saotome – Debut
Kyatto Ninden Teyandee (1990), Yattaro
Super Zugan (1992), Hideyuki Toyotomi
YuYu Hakusho (1993), Jin
Miracle Girls (1993-01-08), Yūda Noda
Jungle King Tar-chan (1993), Etekichi
Nintama Rantarō (1993), Hanabusa Makinosuke
Mobile Fighter G Gundam (1994), Sai Saici
Red Baron (1994), Ken Kurenai
Ginga Sengoku Gun'yuuden Rai (1994), Taisuke
Captain Tsubasa J (1994), Adult Ryo Ishizaki
Wedding Peach (1995), Takurou Amano
Demon Child Zenki (1995), Zenki (little)
Imagination Science World Gulliver Boy (1995), Gulliver Toscanni
Gokinjo Monogatari (1995–96), Tsutomu Yamaguchi
Baby and Me (1996), Takuya Enoki
Brave Command Dagwon (1996), Rai Utsumi
Case Closed (1996), Shinichi Kudo
GeGeGe no Kitarō (1996), Noppera-bō
The Vision of Escaflowne (1996), Shesta
Pokémon (1997), Tōru
Revolutionary Girl Utena (1997), Shiori's ex-boyfriend
Fancy Lala (1998-04-05), Tarō Yoshida
Cowboy Bebop (1998), Rhint – Episode 10
Cyber Team in Akihabara (1998), The White Prince (Crane Bahnsteik)
Takoyaki Mantoman (1998), Blue
Betterman (1999), Keita Aono
Eden's Bowy (1999), Yorn
One Piece (1999), Usopp
Kamikaze Kaitō Jeanne (1999–00), Noin Claude
InuYasha (2000–04, 2009–10), Inuyasha
Baby Felix (2000–01), Poindexter
Gravitation (2000–01), Sakuma Ryūichi
Angelic Layer: Mobile Angel (2001), Ryo Misaki
Beyblade (2001), Michael Parker
Sister Princess (2001), Taro Yamada – Episode 1
Pecola (2001-01), Bashatt
Asobot Military History Goku (2002), Gokū
Atashin'chi (2002), Fujino
Rizelmine (2002), Tomonori Iwaki
Gun Frontier (2002), Tochiro Oyama
The Twelve Kingdoms (2002), Enki
Weiß Kreuz Glühen (2002), Sena Izumi
Mouse (2003), Sorata Muon/Mouse
Di Gi Charat Nyo! (2003), Blue Ranger
Zatch Bell! (2003), Danny
Papuwa (2003), Chappy
Rumiko Takahashi Anthology (2003), Intendant
Peacemaker Kurogane (2003–04), Shinpachi Nagakura
Yu-Gi-Oh! GX (2004), Daitokuji/Amnael
Sgt. Frog (2004), Recruit Tororo
Doki Doki School Hours (2004), Kenta Suetake
DearS (2004), Oikawa Hikorō
Doraemon (2005), Warusa – Episode 228
Eyeshield 21 (2005–08), Raimon "Monta" Tarō
The Law of Ueki (2005), Sōya Hideyoshi
Fushigiboshi no Futagohime (2005), Ghost - Episode 21
Paradise Kiss (2005), Yamaguchi Tsutomu
Futari wa Pretty Cure Splash Star (2006), Flappy
Kiba (2006), Hugh
Death Note (2006–2007), L
Baccano! (2007), Tick Jefferson
Da Capo II (2007), Wataru Itabashi
Neo Angelique ~Abyss~ (2008), Rene
One Outs (2008), Satoshi Ideguchi
To Love-Ru (2008), Lacospo
Pandora Hearts (2009), Cheshire Cat
Magic Kaito (2010-04-17), Kaito Kuroba/Kaitō Kid – Television special
Dororon Enma-kun Meeramera (2011), Enma-kun
Persona 4: The Animation (2011–12), Kuma (Teddie)
Hunter × Hunter (2012), Feitan
Danganronpa: The Animation (2013), Hifumi Yamada
Chō-Bakuretsu I-Jigen Menko Battle Gigant Shooter Tsukasa (2014), Mendō Tsukasa
Persona 4: The Golden Animation (2014), Kuma(Teddie)
Magica Wars (2014), Esora
Magic Kaito 1412 (2014), Kaitō Kid/Kaito Kuroba
JoJo's Bizarre Adventure: Stardust Crusaders (2014), Forever
Rampo Kitan: Game of Laplace (2015), Corpsey
Rin-ne (2015), Sabato Rokudō
Shōwa Genroku Rakugo Shinjū (2016), Amaken
Kamiwaza Wanda (2016-04-23), Wanda
JoJo's Bizarre Adventure: Diamond Is Unbreakable (2016), Shigekiyo Yangu
Nobunaga no Shinobi (2016-10-04), Hideyoshi
The Ancient Magus' Bride (2017), Oberon
Radiant (2018), Master Lord Majesty
Vinland Saga (2019), Jabbathe
Zoids Wild (2019), ムシ仙人 (Ep 21)
Bofuri (2020), Shin
The Gymnastics Samurai (2020), Bigbird Aragaki
Jujutsu Kaisen (2021), Kechizu
Odd Taxi (2021), Kakihana

Original video animation
1+2=Paradise series (1990), Yuusuke Yamamoto
Devil Hunter Yohko (1990), Wakabayashi Osamu
Ryokunohara Labyrinth: Sparkling Phantom (1990), Kanata Tokino
Record of Lodoss War (1990–1991), Etoh
Urotsukidoji II: Legend of the Demon Womb (1990–91), Young Munchausen II
Mōryō Senki MADARA (1991), Madara
Slow Step (1991), Shū Akiba
RG Veda (1991), Ryū-ō
Sōryūden (1991–1993), Amaru Ryudo
The Heroic Legend of Arslan series (1991–1995), Arslan
K.O. Century Beast Warriors (1992–1993), Wan Dabadatta
La Blue Girl (1992–2002), Nin-Nin
Giant Robo: The Day the Earth Stood Still (1992–1998), Daisaku Kusama
Tokyo Babylon (1992–1994), Subaru Sumeragi
Ranma ½ series (1993–1996), Ranma Saotome
The Cockpit, Soldier Utsunomiya
Fish in the Trap (1994), Matsui Takahiro
Twin Angels (1994), Onimaru
Baki the Grappler (1994), Baki Hanma
Plastic Little (1994), Nichol Hawking
Vixens (1995), Ujita
Fire Emblem (1995), Julian
Jungle de Ikou! (1997), Takuma
Virgin Fleet (1998), Sada
Gravitation: Lyrics of Love (1999), Ryuichi Sakuma
Detective Conan series (2000-ongoing), Shinichi Kudo
Pocket Monsters: Pikachu no Fuyuyasumi 2001 (2001), Delibird
Futari Ecchi (2002), Yamada (Rika's friend)
The Boy Who Carried a Guitar: Kikaider vs. Inazuman (2003), Inazuman
Netrun-mon (2004), BB Runner
Angel's Feather series (2006), Shou Hamura
Freedom Project (2006-11-24–08), Biz
Ranma: Akumu! Shunminkō (2008), Ranma Saotome
Coicent (2011), White deer
The Ancient Magus' Bride: The Boy From the West and the Knight of the Mountain Haze (2021), Oberon

Film animation
Kiki's Delivery Service (1989), Tombo
Ranma ½: Big Trouble in Nekonron, China (1991-11-02), Ranma Saotome
Ranma ½: Nihao My Concubine (1992-08-01), Ranma Saotome
Ranma ½: One Flew Over the Kuno's Nest (1994-08-20), Ranma Saotome
Gokinjo Monogatari (1996-03), Tsutomu Yamaguchi
Kindaichi Shōnen no Jikenbo (1996-12-14), Hajime Kindaichi – Only this first film
Case Closed: The Time Bombed Skyscraper (1997-04-19), Shinichi Kudo
Case Closed: The Fourteenth Target (1998-04-18), Shinichi Kudo
Case Closed: The Last Wizard of the Century (1999-04-17), Shinichi Kudo, Kaito Kid
One Piece series (2000-03-04–09, 2011–12, 2016), Usopp
Case Closed: Captured in Her Eyes (2000-04-22), Shinichi Kudo
Doraemon: Nobita and the Winged Braves (2001-03-10), Tobio
Case Closed: Countdown to Heaven (2001-04-21), Shinichi Kudo
A Tree of Palme (2002-03-16), Roualt
Case Closed: The Phantom of Baker Street (2002-04-20), Shinichi Kudo
Bonobono: Kumomo no Ki no Koto (2002-08-10), Araiguma-kun
Detective Conan: Crossroad in the Ancient Capital (2003-04-19), Shinichi Kudo
Dead Leaves (2004-01-16), Retro
Detective Conan: Magician of the Silver Sky (2004-04-17), Shinichi Kudo, Kaito Kid
Detective Conan: Strategy Above the Depths (2005-04-09), Shinichi Kudo
Dōbutsu no Mori (2006), Fūta the Owl
Detective Conan: The Private Eyes' Requiem (2006-04-15), Shinichi Kudo, Kaito Kid
Detective Conan: Jolly Roger in the Deep Azure (2007-04-21), Shinichi Kudo
Detective Conan: Full Score of Fear (2008-04-19), Shinichi Kudo
Detective Conan: The Raven Chaser (2009-04-18), Shinichi Kudo
Omae Umasou da na (2010), Heart
Detective Conan: The Lost Ship in the Sky (2010-04-17), Shinichi Kudo, Kaito Kid
Detective Conan: Quarter of Silence (2011-04-16), Shinichi Kudo
Detective Conan: The Eleventh Striker (2012-04-14), Shinichi Kudo
Tiger & Bunny: The Beginning (2012-09-22), Robin
Asura (2012-09-29), 
Detective Conan: Private Eye in the Distant Sea (2013-04-20), Shinichi Kudo
Lupin the 3rd vs. Detective Conan: The Movie (2013-12-07), Shinichi Kudo, Kaito Kid
Detective Conan: Dimensional Sniper (2014-04-19), Shinichi Kudo
Anata o Zutto Aishiteru (2015), Barudo
The Boy and the Beast (2015), Jirōmaru – teen
Detective Conan: Sunflowers of Inferno (2015-04-18), Shinichi Kudo, Kaito Kid
Detective Conan: The Darkest Nightmare (2016-04-16)
 detective conan 23 the fist blue sapphire (2019)
Odd Taxi: In the Woods (2022), Kakihana

Web animation
Ikuze! Gen-san (2008), Genzō Tamura
JoJo's Bizarre Adventure: Stone Ocean (2022), Yo-Yo Ma

Live action
Godzilla Island (1998), Dogora
Tetsuwan Tantei Robotack (1998), Torabolt
Moero!! Robocon (1999), Robopachi
Pretty Guardian Sailor Moon (2003), Artemis
Tokusou Sentai Dekaranger (2004), Thousanian Gineka (ep. 34)
Tensou Sentai Goseiger (2010), Marloid Ain-I of the Neutral (Coro) (ep. 41)
Unofficial Sentai Akibaranger (2013), Chief Clerk Blu-ray (ep. 2), Chief Editor HVD (ep. 3)
Zyuden Sentai Kyoryuger vs. Go-Busters: The Great Dinosaur Battle! Farewell Our Eternal Friends (2014), ToQger Equipment Voice
Ressha Sentai ToQger (2014-20-16–15), Ticket, ToQger Equipment Voice
Ressha Sentai ToQger Vs. Kamen Rider Gaim Spring Vacation Combining Special (2014), Ticket, ToQger Equipment Voice
Heisei Rider vs. Shōwa Rider: Kamen Rider Taisen feat. Super Sentai (2014), ToQger Equipment Voice
Ressha Sentai ToQger the Movie: Galaxy Line S.O.S. (2014), Ticket, ToQger Equipment Voice
Ressha Sentai ToQger vs. Kyoryuger: The Movie (2015), Ticket, ToQger Equipment Voice
They Went and Came Back Again Ressha Sentai ToQGer: Super ToQ 7gou of Dreams (2015), Ticket, ToQger Equipment Voice
Shuriken Sentai Ninninger vs. ToQger the Movie: Ninja in Wonderland (2016), Ticket, ToQger Equipment Voice
Doubutsu Sentai Zyuohger (2016), Illusion (ep. 22)

Video games
Ranma ½: Chougi Rambuhen (1994) - Ranma Saotome (Male)
Crash Bandicoot (1996) - Crash Bandicoot
Ranma ½ Battle Renaissance (1996) - Ranma Saotome
Hot Shots Golf (1997) - Tatsu
Breath of Fire III (1997) - Ryu
Grandia (1997) - Rapp
Crash Bandicoot 2: Cortex Strikes Back (1997) - Crash Bandicoot
Real Bout Fatal Fury Special: Dominated Mind (1998) - Jin Chonrei, Jin Chonshu
Thousand Arms (1998) - Meis Triumph
Crash Bandicoot 3: Warped (1998) - Crash Bandicoot
Crash Team Racing (1999) - Crash Bandicoot, Fake Crash
Crash Bash (2000) - Crash Bandicoot
Crash Bandicoot: The Wrath of Cortex (2001) - Crash Bandicoot, Wa-Wa
Breath of Fire IV (2000) - Ryu
Inuyasha (2001) — Inuyasha 
GetBackers Dakkanoku: Ubawareta Mugenshiro (2002) - Ginji Amano
Breath of Fire: Dragon Quarter (2002) - Ryu
Kannagi no Tori (2002) - Ryuu Watanuki
2nd Super Robot Wars Alpha (2003) - Tobia Arronax
Crash Nitro Kart (2003) - Crash Bandicoot, Fake Crash
Harry Potter and the Prisoner of Azkaban (2004) - Harry Potter (Tom Attenborough)
Tales of Rebirth (2004) - Tytree Crowe
Madagascar (2005) - Mort (Dee Bradley Baker)
NeoGeo Battle Coliseum (2005) - Jin Chonshū, Jin Chonrei
Battle Stadium D.O.N (2006) - Usopp
Destroy All Humans! (2007) - Cryptosporidium 137 (Grant Albrecht)
L the Prologue to Death Note -Rasen no Trap- (2008) - L
GetAmped2 (2008) - Jacky Noboru
Persona 4 (2008) - Kuma(Teddie)
Maji de Watashi ni Koi Shinasai! (2009) - Ikurō Fukumoto
Another Century's Episode: R (2010) - Tobia Arronax
Dangan Ronpa: Academy of Hope and High School Students of Despair (2010) - Hifumi Yamada
Dragon Ball Heroes (2010) - Avatar: Majin, Hero-type
In Search of the Lost Future (2010) - Eitarō Kenny Osafune
Mobile Suit Gundam: Extreme Vs. (2010) - Tobia Arronax, Sai Saici
Super Robot Taisen Original Generation (2011) - Tasuku Shinguji
Ni no Kuni: Wrath of the White Witch (2011) - Mark/Philip
Persona 4 Golden (2012) - Kuma(Teddie)
Persona 4 Arena (2012) - Kuma(Teddie)
JoJo's Bizarre Adventure: All Star Battle (2013) - Shigekiyo Yangu
Persona 4 Arena Ultimax (2013) - Kuma(Teddie)
Persona Q: Shadow of the Labyrinth (2014) - Kuma/Teddie
Sonic Boom: Shattered Crystal (2014) - Q-N-C
Sonic Boom: Rise of Lyric (2014) - Q-N-C
JoJo's Bizarre Adventure: Eyes of Heaven (2015) - Shigekiyo Yangu
Breath of Fire 6: Hakuryū no Shugosha-tachi (2016) - Ryu
Super Smash Bros. Ultimate (2018) - Mii Fighter Type 7
Persona Q2: New Cinema Labyrinth (2018) - Kuma(Teddie)
MapleStory (2019), male Hoyoung
Final Fantasy VII Remake (2020) - Red XIII
Ghost of Tsushima (2020) - Taka 

Angel's Feather series, Shō Hamura
Crash Bandicoot series, Crash Bandicoot, Fake Crash, Wa-Wa the Water Elemental (Brendan O'Brien, Billy Pope, Steve Blum, Michael Connor, Dwight Schultz, R. Lee Ermey)
Harry Potter series, Harry Potter (as of Prisoner of Azkaban)
Imagination Science World Gulliver Boy, Gulliver Toscanni
Inuyasha series, Inuyasha
Legend of the Hungry Wolf series, Jin Chonshū and Chonrei – from Fatal Fury 3: Road to the Final Victory to Real Bout Fatal Fury 2: The Newcomers
The Legend of Xanadu series, Arios
Neo Angelique series, René
One Piece series, Usopp
Pokémon Mystery Dungeon: Time Exploration Team and Darkness Exploration Team, Hikozaru
Ranma ½, Ranma Saotome – PC Engine
Record of Lodoss War series, Eto
SD Gundam G Generation Spirits, WARS, WORLD, Tobia Arronax, Sai Saici
Tengai Makyō series, Danjūrō Kabuki

Drama CD
 Panda-shachou

Dubbing roles

Live-action
10,000 BC (2011 TV Asahi edition), Baku
Ant-Man and the Wasp: Quantumania, Veb (David Dastmalchian)
Charlie and the Chocolate Factory (2008 NTV edition), Mike Teavee (Jordan Fry)
Dragonball Evolution, Goku (Justin Chatwin)
Journey to the West: The Demons Strike Back, The King (Bao Bei'er)
Smash, Tom Levitt (Christian Borle)

Animation
A Goofy Movie, Max Goof
A Matter of Loaf and Death, Baker Bob (Ben Whitehead)
An Extremely Goofy Movie, Max Goof
The Bad Guys, Professor Marmalade
Rio, Blu
Rio 2, Blu
Sonic the Hedgehog, Sonic 
South Park, Kyle (WOWOW dub)
Space Jam: A New Legacy, Bugs Bunny
Tinpo, Logipo
Adventures of Sonic the Hedgehog, Sonic 
Amphibia, Hop Pop (Bill Farmer)
Beast Wars: Transformers, Rattrap (Scott McNeil)
Disney's House of Mouse, Max Goof (Jason Marsden)
Justice League, Booster Gold (Tom Everett Scott)
Looney Tunes, Bugs Bunny (Mel Blanc)
Baby Looney Tunes, Baby Bugs Bunny (Samuel Vincent)
The Looney Tunes Show, Bugs Bunny (Jeff Bergman)
Tweety's High-Flying Adventure, Bugs Bunny (Joe Alaskey)
Madagascar, Mort (Andy Richter)
Madagascar: Escape 2 Africa, Mort (Andy Richter)
Madagascar 3: Europe's Most Wanted, Mort (Andy Richter)
Maya & Miguel, Tito Chavez (Candi Milo)
My Little Pony: Equestria Girls, Snips (Lee Tockar)
My Little Pony: Equestria Girls – Rainbow Rocks, Snips (Lee Tockar)
My Little Pony: Friendship Is Magic, Snips (Lee Tockar)
Looney Tunes: Back In Action, Bugs Bunny (Joe Alaskey)
Penguins of Madagascar, Mort (Andy Richter)
The Pirates Who Don't Do Anything: A VeggieTales Movie, Sedgewick (Phil Vischer)
Shirt Tales, Leknid from "Shirt Napped", Sparky from "Kip's Dragon"
Sealab 2021 – Stormy (Ellis Henican)
South Park, Kyle Broflovski (Matt Stone), Jimmy Valmer (Trey Parker), Craig Tucker (Matt Stone), Clyde Donovan (Trey Parker), Sixth Grade Leader, Dougie
Space Jam, Bugs Bunny (Billy West)
Teenage Mutant Ninja Turtles (2012 TV series), Michelangelo (Greg Cipes)
Transformers Animated, Jetfire, Rattle Trap, (Tom Kenny)
VeggieTales, Larry the Cucumber (Mike Nawrocki)

Commercials
M&M's (Japanese) – Red M&M (Billy West)
Burger King (Japanese) - Narrator

Discography

Audio dramas
20 Mensou Ni Onegai! (1990-06-21) – Victor VICL-3001
Aa Megami-sama Music and Short Story (1991), Keiichi Morisato
Rockman Kiki Ippatsu Drama (1995), Robo 1
Princess Quest (1996), Gateau
Devil May Cry CD Drama Volume 2 Episode 1: Devil's Neverland - Peter Pan

Singles
Rollin (1990-10-24), Futureland/Youmex – TYDY-5147
Kon'ya ha April Fool (1991-01-21), Pony Canyon – Ranma ½ character single as Ranma Saotome (male)
Otousan (1991-01-21), Pony Canyon – Ranma ½ as Ranma Saotome (male), sings "China kara no Tegami" with Megumi Hayashibara
Characters Christmas (1991-01-21), Pony Canyon – Ranma ½ as Ranma Saotome (male)
Ranma to Akane no Ballad (1993-10-06), Pony Canyon – Ranma ½ as Ranma Saotome (male)
Unbalance City (1996-07-20), Nippon Columbia – COCC-13586

Albums
Everybody's Christmas (1990-11-21) – TYCY-5148
Twinbeee Paradise Nesshou! Vocal Battle Hen (1994-04-21) – Twinbeee Paradise
Fancy Lala Final Best Selection (1998-12-16) – Fancy Lala album
Shouwa Hit Studio (2011-07-06), Enma-kun – Dororon Enma-kun Meeramera
Futari wa Pretty Cure Splash Star 2nd ED (2006)

Radio shows
Pure Pure Island (aired for a month in 1998 as a tie-in with the anime series Fancy Lala and was co-hosted with J-pop singer Reiko Ōmori who was also the voice actress who voiced Miho Shinohara)
Hiroi Ouji's Maruten Cha Cha Cha! (ongoing, co-hosted with voice actress Chisa Yokoyama and Sakura Taisen creator Ohji Hiroi)

Awards

References

External links
  
 Official agency profile at Gekidan21 Seiki Fox 
 Kappei Yamaguchi at GamePlaza-Haruka Voice Acting Database 
 seiyuu.info
 
 
 

1965 births
Living people
Japanese male stage actors
Japanese male video game actors
Japanese male voice actors
Male voice actors from Fukuoka Prefecture
People from Fukuoka
Rakugoka
20th-century Japanese male actors
21st-century Japanese male actors